Erick Luis Palma dos Santos is a Brazilian footballer, known as just Erick Luis, who plays as a forward.

He has previously played in Campeonato Brasileiro Série A with Bahia and in Campeonato Brasileiro Série B with Bragantino, Boa Esporte, Joinville and Oeste.

Career
In January 2015 Erick Luis was signed by Vasco da Gama on a two year contract, but was not registered to play by the club, instead being successively loaned out to Bragantino, Boa Esporte, Osasco Audax and Joinville. He did not play a competitive game for Vasco da Gama.

References

External links
 

Living people
1992 births
Brazilian footballers
Brazilian expatriate footballers
Association football forwards
Esporte Clube Bahia players
Olaria Atlético Clube players
Galícia Esporte Clube players
União Agrícola Barbarense Futebol Clube players
Clube Atlético Bragantino players
Boa Esporte Clube players
Grêmio Osasco Audax Esporte Clube players
Joinville Esporte Clube players
Oeste Futebol Clube players
Manama Club players
Botafogo Futebol Clube (SP) players
Esporte Clube São Bento players
SHB Da Nang FC players
Campeonato Brasileiro Série A players
Campeonato Brasileiro Série B players
Campeonato Brasileiro Série C players
Bahraini Premier League players
V.League 1 players
Expatriate footballers in Bahrain
Expatriate footballers in Vietnam
Brazilian expatriate sportspeople in Bahrain
Brazilian expatriate sportspeople in Vietnam
Sportspeople from Salvador, Bahia